Patrick Alan Batteaux (born April 18, 1978) is a former American football wide receiver who played two seasons with the San Diego Chargers of the National Football League (NFL). In his third season in the NFL, he was in the San Diego Chargers training camp. He played college football and college basketball at Texas Christian University and attended Elkins High School in Missouri City, Texas.

Professional career
Batteaux played in five games for the NFL's San Diego Chargers during the 2001 NFL season, recording 3 receptions for 25 yards. He was released by the Chargers on September 1, 2002.

References

External links
Just Sports Stats

Living people
1978 births
Players of American football from Houston
American football wide receivers
American football quarterbacks
African-American players of American football
TCU Horned Frogs football players
San Diego Chargers players
21st-century African-American sportspeople
20th-century African-American sportspeople